The Webster Centre for Infectious Diseases is a research centre based at the Otago School of Medical Sciences, University of Otago, Dunedin, New Zealand dedicated to supporting basic research in infectious diseases throughout New Zealand. Primarily its mission is to provide molecular solutions to problems in infectious diseases through the application of modern methods of molecular and translational research. The Webster Centre endeavors to be a major player in the development of new vaccines, diagnostics and antimicrobials.

At present the Webster Centre offers research support in the forms of student support, sponsored seminar programs and New Zealand wide symposiums on Infectious Disease Research.

The Webster Centre for Infectious Diseases is directed by Kurt Krause, Professor of Biochemistry at the University of Otago and coordinated by Rebecca Psutka.

The Webster Centre for Infectious Diseases has adopted a multi-disciplinary approach and researchers in the areas of chemistry, biochemistry, microbiology, immunology, molecular genetics, pharmacy, pharmacology and public health are all part of the Webster Centre for Infectious Diseases.

References

External links
 
 Otago School of Medical Sciences

University of Otago
Research institutes in New Zealand